Gian Nicola Berti (born 9 August 1960) is a politician who served as a Captain Regent of San Marino (alongside Massimo Andrea Ugolini). He served from 1 April 2016 to 1 October 2016 and represented We Sammarinese.

Berti was first elected to the Grand and General Council in 2008. He is a lawyer by profession, and is married with two children. A shooting sportsman, he competed in the 1988 Seoul Olympics and was the flag bearer for San Marino. His son, Gian Marco, represented San Marino in shooting at the 2020 Summer Olympics and won a silver medal.

References

1960 births
Captains Regent of San Marino
Living people
Members of the Grand and General Council
Olympic shooters of San Marino
Sammarinese lawyers
Shooters at the 1988 Summer Olympics
Sammarinese male sport shooters